Edison Mauricio Duarte Barajas (born 24 June 1992) is a Colombian professional footballer who plays as a leftback for Defensa y Justicia.

Professional career
Duarte made his professional debut with Cúcuta in a 1-1 Categoría Primera A tie with Boyacá Chicó on 27 November 2011. A mainstay for Cúcuta from 2011 to 2020, he joined Defensa y Justicia on 25 January 2020.

Honours
Cúcuta Deportivo;
 Categoría Primera B: 2018

References

External links
 

1992 births
Living people
People from Cúcuta
Colombian footballers
Association football fullbacks
Cúcuta Deportivo footballers
Cortuluá footballers
Defensa y Justicia footballers
Categoría Primera A players
Categoría Primera B players
Argentine Primera División players
Colombian expatriate footballers
Expatriate footballers in Argentina